These are the Billboard magazine R&B albums that reached number one in 1977.

Chart history

See also
1977 in music
R&B number-one hits of 1977 (USA)

1977